Whoopee! was a British comic book magazine that ran from (issues dates) 9 March 1974 to 30 March 1985, when it merged with Whizzer and Chips. It was published by IPC Magazines Ltd and ran for 572 issues.

The first issue of Whoopee! ran to forty pages, with a free gift in the form of a 'squirter ring'. The strapline exhorted potential readers to "Get happy — get this paper!".

Shiver and Shake merged with Whoopee! shortly after its launch in 1974, followed by Cheeky in 1980 and Wow! in 1983.  Whoopee! annuals continued to appear well into the late 1980s, and a Best of Whoopee! monthly reprints comic was published for a few years in the early 1990s.

Strips

 Ad Lad — a Les Gray lookalike obsessed with getting his face on television
 Bleep! (from Wow!)
 Blinketty Blink
 Blunder Puss (from Shiver and Shake)
 Bookworm — a bespectacled, book-loving schoolboy
 Boy Boss (from Wow!) — the nominal editor of a children's comic, who annoyed his staff by preferring playground games to official business
 Calculator Kid — a young boy with a distinctive rollercoaster-shaped hairstyle and a helpful calculator which helped him out of scrapes
 Cheeky Chudley — (Bets on the 'osses... it's a no brainer!)
 Cheeky (from Cheeky)
 Chip Creepy Car (from Shiver and Shake)
 Creepy Comix (from Wow!)
 Dads as Lads — two dads reminiscing about their childhood while their sons played pranks on them
 Daisy Jones' Locket Dick Doobee — 'Back to Front Man', an innovative strip from The Guardian cartoonist Steve Bell
 Evil Eye — a ghostly disembodied optic organ causes previously well-behaved citizens to indulge in criminal activities
 Family Trees (from Wow!)
 Frankie Stein (from Wham! and then Shiver and Shake) — a smiley-faced Boris Karloff lookalike; by Robert Nixon (originally by Ken Reid)
 Fun Fear Ghoul Getters Ltd (from Shiver and Shake)
 KBR — Kids Band Radio (from Wow!) — a spoof on the CB radio phenomenon, with similarly outlandish jargon ("the cakes have gonked on my chunker!")
 Kids Court — a courtroom for adults who do wrong to kids
 Lolly Pop — a rotund, extremely rich and incredibly miserly man who begrudged his son almost everything
 Mum's the Word Mustapha Million (from Cheeky) — a stereotypical Arab schoolboy who splashed money around to make his schoolmates' lives more comfortable
 '''Orrible 'Ole
 Ossie (from Wow!)
 Paddywack (from Cheeky) — a buck-toothed, curly-haired Irish labourer who enacted Irish jokes in three-panel strips
 Scared-Stiff Sam — a hulking giant who was nonetheless scared of everything, including his own teddy bear
 Scream Inn (from Shiver and Shake)
 Shake (from Shiver and Shake)
 Snarky Sharky (He Always Trips Over Fans!)
 Shipwreck School (from Wow!)
 Shiver (from Shiver and Shake)
 Smiler — an eternally happy lad with a fixed grin
 Snap Happy
 Spare-Part Kit
 Spy School
 Stage School — a grumpy teacher takes a class full of budding comedians, dancers, musicians and novelty performers
 Supermum
 Sweeny Toddler (from Shiver and Shake) — an ugly, mischievous, highly anti-social infant created by Leo Baxendale
 Team Mates (from Wow!)
 The Bumpkin Billionaires — a family of farm labourers win a fortune on the pools and spend all their time trying to give it away
 Tom Horror's World — a bespectacled budding inventor tries out his contraptions on his unwilling father, who usually comes off worst
 Toy Boy — a plaything-obsessed lad, usually seen playing an accordion in the title frame
 Trevor's Treasure Tracker — boy with a metal detector
 Willy Worry — a boy who misunderstood simple expressions (e.g. "I can see right through you"), taking them literally and worrying about the consequences.

References

Notes

Sources 
 

1974 comics debuts
1985 comics endings
Comics magazines published in the United Kingdom
British humour comics
Defunct British comics
Fleetway and IPC Comics titles
Magazines established in 1974
Magazines disestablished in 1985
Magazines about comics